Franco Fasciana (born 8 March 1960) is a Venezuelan footballer. He played in five matches for the Venezuela national football team from 1989 to 1991. He was also part of Venezuela's squad for the 1991 Copa América tournament.

References

External links
 

1960 births
Living people
Venezuelan footballers
Venezuela international footballers
Place of birth missing (living people)
Association football goalkeepers
Monagas S.C. managers